Martina Smilkovska (born 22 October 1993) is a Macedonian footballer who plays as a defender for 1. liga club ŽFK Istatov. She has been a member of the North Macedonia women's national team.

References

1993 births
Living people
Women's association football defenders
Macedonian women's footballers
North Macedonia women's international footballers